The 2017 Asian Women's Club League Handball Championship was the second edition of the competition held from 23 to 29 September 2017 at Uzbekistan Sports Complex in Tashkent (Uzbekistan). It was organised by the Handball Federation of Uzbekistan under the aegis of Asian Handball Federation. It was the official competition for women's handball clubs of Asia crowning the Asian champions.

Participating teams

1 Bold indicates champion for that year. Italics indicates host.

Round-Robin

Match Results

Final standings

References

External links
 Official Website

International handball competitions hosted by Uzbekistan
Handball competitions in Asia
Asian Handball Championships
Asian Women's Club League Handball Championship, 2017
Asia